Shipur is a fast growing village under Egra I community development block of Purba Medinipur district in the state of West Bengal, India. Famous for its annual Charak Puja, this village has well-developed social facilities like schools, post office, market, telecommunication etc. A health centre is also proposed for this village. As per Constitution of India and Panchayati Raj Act, Shipur village is administrated by Sarpanch (Gram Pradhan) who is the elected representative of village. Shipur is under the administration of Sahara Gram Panchayat.

Geography

Though officially Shipur is a small single village, Greater Shipur is considered as a group of seven small villages or Mouzas including Shipur. itself along with Shunia., Sinduria., Shatkania., Hatbar., Pandua. and Tahalia.

Demography
Total population of Greater Shipur is 8881 as per 2011 Census of India.

Average sex ratio of Greater Shipur is 960 female per 1000 male which is higher than West Bengal state average of 950.

The village has higher literacy rate compared to West Bengal. In 2011, literacy rate of Greater Shipur was 87.65% compared to 76.26% of West Bengal. In Greater Shipur Male literacy stood at 93.60% while female literacy rate was 81.45%.

Most of the people here are cultivators or related to agricultural work.

Climate
There are mainly three seasons in Shipur, namely Summer, Monsoon and Winter. Summer starts in April and continues till June with a maximum temperature of 37 °C. But due to proximity of sea, cold wind keeps the weather pleasant in this time. Next comes monsoon in July and lasts till the end of September. Shipur generally experiences an average rainfall with high humidity in the monsoon season. Winter sets in October and lasts till February with temperature ranging from 24-7 °C.

Transport
Egra, a well-known municipal town situated at 19.1 kilometer north-east of Shipur, works as the main connector for it.

Bus service
There is bus service from Shipur to Kolkata/Howrah via Egra.  It is almost a 5-hour journey to Kolkata. There is no direct bus service to the other parts of West Bengal and for this reason people come to Egra first and then avail their desired bus service for their destinations. Although Digha, the famous beach-town, is only 34.8 kilometer away it is also not directly accessible. Trekkers, Autos and Rickshaws are some other popular mode of transportation.

Trains
There is no train route to Shipur. Nearest railway station is Ramnagar

Nearby places of interest
Due to proximity of the Bay of Bengal there are many places to visit during the weekend. Among them Digha, Shankarpur, Mandarmani, Talsari Beach, Subarnarekha River are famous for their tourist attraction.

Festivals

Shipur is famous for its Charak Puja which is celebrated here with much enthusiasm every year during the last week of April for five days. Hindu Lord Shiva is named here as Lord Keshabeswar and this enchanting  festival, as people believe, is organized to satisfy him.

References

External links 
 on population of Shipur
 on population of Shunia
 on population of Sinduria
 on population of Shatkania
 on population of Hatbar
 on population of Pandua
 on population of Tahalia

Villages in Purba Medinipur district